Gökalp or Gokalp is a Turkish male given name and surname formed by the two Turkish words gök ("sky; blue") and alp ("brave, hero") – therefore literally be translated as "sky hero", but considering the second meaning of gök also as "blue eyed hero" –  and may refer to:

Surname 
 , Turkish soprano
  (born 1946), Turkish politician
  (1933–2009), Turkish footballer
 Mertim Gokalp (born 1981), Australian portrait and figure painter
 Ziya Gökalp (1876–1924), Turkish sociologist, writer, poet, and political activist

Male given name 
  (born 1982), German-Turkish boxer
  (born 1985), Turkish footballer
  (born 1994), Turkish ice hockey player
 Göktürk Gökalp Ural (born 1995), Turkish basketball player

References

Turkish-language surnames
Masculine given names
Turkish masculine given names